Phoolon Ki Sej is a 1964 Indian Hindi-language social film written and directed by Inder Raj Anand. It stars Ashok Kumar, Manoj Kumar, Vyjayanthimala in lead roles, along with Nirupa Roy, Lalita Pawar, Mehmood, Shubha Khote, Mukri, Kanhaiyalal in supporting roles. Music by Adi Narayana Rao is featured, including the song "Aa Bhi Ja Rasiya". The movie was based on Gulshan Nanda's novel of the same name. The film was produced by Anjali Pictures, the production company owned by actress Anjali Devi and husband P. Adinarayana Rao. Phoolon Ki Sej is about a love between Nirmal Verma and Karuna.

Plot
Nirmal Verma (Manoj Kumar) and Karuna (Vjyanthi Mala) are attracted to each other, while the former is touring that part of the country along with friend Girdhari (Mehmood). They get intimate during a rainy misadventure and he promises to return, and leaves his address with her, but she misplaces it. She becomes pregnant and leaves in search of Nirmall at Hyderabad. Didi (Lalita Pawar) keeps her from committing suicide.  Later, Karuna delivers her son, Suraj (Master Babloo).  Both meet after five years, and after formal introductions, get married.  Didi doesn't allow Karuna to disclose the truth about the child.  She re-locates to live with him and his brother, Dr. Verma (Ashok Kumar) and Bhabhi, Janki (Nirupa Roy). She visits her son whenever possible at Didi's place.  Girdhari, son of Banwari (Kanaiyalal), is in love with Missy (Shobha Khote), the daughter of Jacket (Mukri).  They marry against their parents wishes and so are kept separate from each other, but they regularly meet in secret.  Dr. Verma adopts Suraj when Karuna and Nirmal have gone on vacation.  Karuna is shocked to find her son Suraj at home and can't hide her motherly emotions.  Nirmal finds out the truth about Karuna from Girdhari, who had seen Karuna at Dr. Verma's hospital earlier.   Karuna finally divulges the truth to the family when Suraj gets very sick and calls for his mother.  Nirmal also comes back and accepts his responsibility and the family re-unites.

Cast
 Ashok Kumar as Dr. Verma
 Manoj Kumar as Nirmal Verma
 Vyjayanthimala as Karuna
 Nirupa Roy as Janki Verma
 Mehmood as Girdhari
 Kanhaiyalal as Banwari
 Lalita Pawar as Didi
 Mukri as Jack
 Shubha Khote as Misy
Choreographer
 Gopi Krishan

Dances
Gopi Krishan and Vyjayanti Mala dance, as well as the Madras Sisters (Sasi, Kala, and Mala).

Soundtrack

Box office
At the end of its theatrical run, Phoolon Ki Sej grossed around 90,00,000 with a net of 45,00,000, thus becoming the eighteenth highest-grossing film of 1964, with a verdict of average success at Box Office India.

References

External links
 
 Phoolon Ki Sej profile at Upperstall.com

1964 films
1960s Hindi-language films
Indian romantic drama films
1964 romantic drama films
Indian black-and-white films
Films based on Indian novels
Films scored by P. Adinarayana Rao